Positive non-interventionism was the economic policy of Hong Kong; this policy can be traced back to the time when Hong Kong was under British rule. It was first officially implemented in 1971 by Financial Secretary of Hong Kong John Cowperthwaite, who believed that the economy was doing well in the absence of government intervention but that it was important to create the regulatory and physical infrastructure to facilitate market-based decision making. The policy was continued by subsequent Financial Secretaries, including Sir Philip Haddon-Cave. Economist Milton Friedman has cited it as a fairly comprehensive implementation of laissez-faire policy.

First-hand explanation 
According to Cowperthwaite:

In the long run, the aggregate of decisions of individual businessmen, exercising individual judgment in a free economy, even if often mistaken, is less likely to do harm than the centralised decisions of a government; and certainly the harm is likely to be counteracted faster.

According to Haddon-Cave:

positive non-interventionism involves taking the view that it is normally futile and damaging to the growth rate of an economy, particularly an open economy, for the Government to attempt to plan the allocation of resources available to the private sector and to frustrate the operation of market forces.

Haddon-Cave goes on to say that the "positive" part means the government carefully considers each possible intervention to determine "where the advantage" lies, and, although usually it will come to the conclusion that the intervention is harmful, sometimes it will decide to intervene.

See also
 John James Cowperthwaite
 Milton Friedman
 Philip Haddon-Cave

References

External links
Big Market, Small Government- by Donald Tsang, Chief Executive of Hong Kong

Economic ideologies
Economy of Hong Kong
Capitalism